The A. A. Turki Group of Companies (ATCO) is a group of standalone companies and joint ventures that operate in areas such as automation and control, commercial trading and services, port management and marine services, civil and electromechanical construction, retail services, waste management, chemical cleaning, industrial services, manufacturing, transportation and logistics management, oil and gas products and services, catering and food services, turnkey dewatering systems, and environmental services.

It was founded in the mid-1950s and has been operating in Saudi Arabia's governmental, industrial, and consumer sectors.  It was founded by Sheikh Abdul Rahman Al-Turki.

The group is divided into several smaller companies. These include:

- ATCO Commercial: provides services in the energy sector

- ATCO Construction Material: distribution operations for building materials for major construction companies, including the Saudi Binladin Group.

- East and West Factory: manufactures LV electrical panels

- East and West Express: a logistics company. Provides household removal, freight forwarding, packing and crating, logistics services and insurance. Its customers include Saudi Aramco, Saudi Electricity Company and SABIC.

- ATCO Port Management & Marine Services: provides offshore transportation services such as offshore support vessels, anchor handling tugs, docking tugs, etc.

- ATCO Food: provides catering services and restaurant management. Its customers include Saudi Aramco and the Saudi Arabian National Guard.

- East and West Factory Automation Systems: service provider in panel design, engineering, drafting and cabinet creation. Its customers include Honeywell, Schneider Electric, Alstom, etc.

1950 establishments in Saudi Arabia
Conglomerate companies established in 1950
Conglomerate companies of Saudi Arabia
Companies based in Dammam